Pandorea nervosa is a species of flowering plant in the family Bignoniaceae and is endemic to Queensland. It is a woody vine that grows in rainforest and has pinnate leaves with three or five leaflets, and white, tube-shaped flowers.

Description

Taxonomy
Pandorea nervosa was first formally described in 1931 by Cornelis Gijsbert Gerrit Jan van Steenis in the Journal of the Arnold Arboretum from specimens collected near Boonjie on the Atherton Tableland in 1929. The specific epithet (nervosa) means "many veins".

Distribution and habitat

References

nervosa
Vines
Lamiales of Australia
Flora of Queensland
Plants described in 1931
Taxa named by Cornelis Gijsbert Gerrit Jan van Steenis